"Liquidator" is a reggae instrumental by Jamaican band Harry J Allstars. It reached number nine on the UK Singles Chart in November 1969 and was certified silver in the UK in April 2022.

Background 
Carlton "Carly" Barrett has said that the instrumental was originally for a song by Tony Scott, "What Am I to Do". Harry Johnson bought the rights from Scott, licensed the track to Trojan and credited it to the Harry J Allstars. But Alton Ellis has said that the core of the song was a lift from his rocksteady hit "Girl I've Got a Date".

Musicians involved in the recording included the core of The Hippy Boys: bassist 'Family Man' Aston Barrett, drummer Carlton Barrett and guitarist Alva Lewis. They later formed the core of The Upsetters and The Wailers. The organ was played by Winston Wright who, as a member of Tommy McCook's Supersonics, was acknowledged as Jamaica's master of the Hammond organ. Wright featured on other Harry Johnson hits, including The Beltones' "No More Heartaches" and on Boris Gardiner's "Elizabethan Reggae".

Certifications

Other versions 
A variation was recorded featuring the sax of Val Bennett (entitled "Tons of Gold"), but the Hippy Boys' original instrumental had the most success.

The Staple Singers used the bass line and introduction from "Liquidator" for their 1972 hit "I'll Take You There".

The Specials covered "Liquidator" as part of the ska covers medley "Skinhead Symphony" on their live EP The Special A.K.A. Live! which reached number one in the UK Singles Chart in January 1980. The renewed interest in the song led to Trojan Records reissuing the Harry J Allstars version as a double A-side with the original version of another song featured in the medley, "Long Shot Kick De Bucket" by The Pioneers, in March 1980. The reissue reached number 42 in the UK Singles Chart.

Use at football matches
"Liquidator" is a popular tune to play as UK football teams run out: Chelsea, Wycombe Wanderers, Northampton Town, Wolverhampton Wanderers, West Bromwich Albion, and St Johnstone all have claims to have been the first club to use it.

Chelsea's claims to be first to play it are supported by the first paragraph of the liner notes for Liquidator – The Best of the Harry J All Stars, which says: "Way back in 1969, supporters of the Chelsea football team revered players such as Bonetti, Osgood and Hollins. The boys performed under the watchful eye of manager Dave Sexton to the tune of 'Liquidator'. The track is played by Chelsea before home games, whilst fans clap the players onto the pitch." It was stopped at Wolves and West Bromwich Albion at the request of West Midlands Police as it promoted hooliganism, although it was played by West Brom in their match against Cardiff City, towards the end of the 2013–14 season, at the start of the match, prompting Wolves fans to call for a return of the song at their home ground.

Yeovil Town adopted the song in 2003.

References

Sporting songs
Chelsea F.C. songs
West Bromwich Albion F.C.
Wolverhampton Wanderers F.C.
Football songs and chants
The Specials songs
Reggae songs
1969 songs
1969 singles